Coupland is a surname. Notable people with the surname include:

Antoine Coupland (born 2003), Canadian soccer player
Diana Coupland (1928–2006), English actress
Douglas Coupland (born 1961), Canadian writer and artist
George Coupland (born 1959), Scottish scientist
Henry Ethelbert Coupland (1915–1994), Canadian farmer, businessman and politician
Jenny Coupland (born 1961), named Miss Australia in 1982
Joe Coupland (1920–1989), Scottish footballer
John de Coupland (died 1363), English soldier and nobleman known for capturing King David II of Scotland in battle
Reginald Coupland (1884–1952), English historian
Robert Coupland (1904–1968), New Zealand cricketer and civil servant
Sarah Coupland, Australian pathologist and academic
Sidney Coupland (1849–1930), English physician
Tiarnie Coupland (born 1997), Australian actress, model and singer